Massillon is an unincorporated community in Massillon Township, Cedar County, Iowa, United States. It is south of the Wapsipinicon River on County Road Y24, west of Toronto and north of Lowden in the northeastern corner of the county, at 41.914844N, -90.922851W.

History
The area where the town of Massillon was founded was originally known as Denson's Ferry, named after a Joseph Denson who ran a ferry on the Wapsipinicon River. The town plat was founded in 1854 and was a station along the Davenport & Northern Railroad.

The first bridge was built over the Wapsipinicon River at Massillon in 1868 at the expense of $4,000.

References

Unincorporated communities in Cedar County, Iowa
Unincorporated communities in Iowa
1854 establishments in Iowa